Tirath Das Dogra (IAST: Tīrath Dās Ḍōgarā, born 18 July 1947) is an Indian forensic pathologist and former Pro-Chancellor and vice-chancellor of SGT University, Budhera Gurgaon Haryana 2013–2017. He is a former director of the All India Institute of Medical Sciences (AIIMS) New Delhi and an authority on forensic medicine. Dogra been member of the Medical Council of India from December 2013 till its dissolution in September 2018. Dogra have been President of National Medicos Organisation Delhi State from 2012 to 2017. Dogra was member of TEQ-Equivalence Committee and Administration and Grievance committee of Medical Council of India. He was member of Advisory committee on MOOC's program of University Grants Commission of India New Delhi. Dogra was emeritus professor of forensic medicine and forensic sciences, professor of Andragogy and educational philosophy and Advidsor, Internal Quality Assurance Cell (IQAC) at SGT University Gurgaon till January 2022. Prof. T D Dogra is member of Rehablitation Council of India.

Dogra held a number of positions during his tenure at AIIMS, including dean (exam), deputy director (administration), chair of the management board of AIIMS Hospitals, hostel superintendent and professor. He joined AIIMS as a resident in 1971, becoming a faculty member in 1977. Following the retirement of Jagdish Chandra on 30 June 1987, Dogra headed the department of forensic medicine and toxicology at AIIMS until his retirement on 31 July 2012. TD DOGRA is nominated member of Rehablitation council of India.

Early life
He was born to Prem Nath Dogra and Gayano Devi Dogra at Badi Brahmana, near Jammu, Jammu & Kashmir, British India, 20 kilometres from Jammu on the Basantar River (the present border with Pakistan). After the partition of India in 1947 his father moved to Bikaner in 1959; he settled there permanently in 1961. Dogra completed Badridas Vidavatji ka Middle School Sikar and Matric in 1963 and attended M M High School Bikaner from 1959 to 1963. After a year at Dungar College Bikaner, he received a degree in medicine from Sardar Patel Medical College, Bikaner.

Career
Dogra received the first MD degree in forensic medicine from AIIMS in 1976. His areas of interest have been DNA profiling, population genetics, residual, environmental and pesticide toxicity, bioethics, pharmacovigilance, continuing medical education, suicide prevention and notes, forensic psychiatry (psychological profiling) crime-scene reconstruction. and Forensic animation He has been involved in medico-legal investigations of high-profile cases throughout India.

Dogra has presented his medico-legal opinion in cases concerning to three prime ministers: Indira Gandhi, Charan Singh and Rajiv Gandhi. He deposed as a medical witness in the Mahesh Chandra Trial Court for Indira Gandhi's assassination for the prosecution.
 Although the defence (P. N. Lekhi, R S Sodhi and Ram Jethmalani) challenged Dogra's testimony, the evidence was upheld by the Supreme Court. In the Batla House encounter case, he used animation to present his expert opinion. Dogra went to Sri Lanka as part of a three-member Government of India team to assist the investigation of the assassination of Gamini Dissanayake, a presidential candidate. He worked with Seyed E. Hasnain, Sher Ali of NII and Anupum Raina on DNA profiling, with Sanjeev Lalwani and Chitranjan Behera assisting him with forensics. After his retirement from AIIMS, Dogra became director-general of the SGT Group of Institutions and vice-chancellor when it became a university on 15 March 2013.

Notable cases
Dogra's forensic investigations include:

His medico-legal cases include:

Awards
The Society of Toxicology (India) gave Dogra a Distinguished Scientist Lifetime Achievement Award in Toxicology, and he received a Distinguished Service Award from the Geriatric Society of India. He delivered the Professor G. Mehdi Oration at the 27th annual national conference of the Indian Academy of Forensic Medicine at North Bengal Medical College in Siliguri, West Bengal on 17 February 2006. Dogra delivered the Professor Jagdish Chandra Oration Award at the 
12th national conference of the Indian Congress of Forensic Medicine 
and Toxicology on 27 September 2013 at the Government Medical College in Haldwani, Uttarakhand. Indian Congress of Forensic Medicine and Toxicology gave "Life time achievement award" to Prof Dogra on 13 September 2014.

AIIMS
During Dogra's tenure as director AIIMS acquired  of land in the Jajhar District of Haryana, and the recommendations of the Moily Committee were implemented. One hundred sixty faculty and 1200 other staff positions were created, a new academic building (came as Convergence Block) was planned and the CDER and JPNA Apex Trauma Center were made fully functional. An agreement with Metro was signed for a tunnel connecting AIIMS and the trauma centre. A surgical centre, maternity centre, dormitories, outpatient department and a urology centre were planned. A new developmental plan integrated with the earlier prepared Master plan was prepared and architectural process was started for its implementation. The long pending clearance from Ministry of civil aviation and urban development for construction of multistory buildings was obtained to facilitate future development of AIIMS in regard to hospital, academics, research, residential and hostels. Manmohan Singh underwent coronary-bypass Surgery at AIIMS, and Pratibha Patil underwent cataract surgery on both eyes. Dogra managed AIIMS during the most troubled times in its history; he is active in organ donation, retrieval and tracking, framing and revising rules and implementing training programs at the AIIMS Organ Retrieval Banking Organization. After succeeding Jagdish Chandra, Dogra developed DNA-profiling and toxicology laboratories. He expanded the department to ten faculty members, two scientists, twelve junior and twelve senior residents.

DNA laboratory
Dogra started DNA facility at department of forensic medicine AIIMS, in Feb 1991 with recruiting of Anupuma Raina as PhD student and G. Bomjen as MD student both taking DNA profiling related thesis topics, Dogra as Chief Guide and Dr S Hasnain of NII New Delhi as co-guide.  First criminal case solved by DNA from Delhi was in 1992. The integrity and hard work of its in-charge Dr Anupuma raina gave this laboratory reliability and popularity with investigating agencies.

Medical Toxicology Laboratory
Dr Dogra developed Medical Toxicological laboratory in the department of forensic medicine and toxicology in 1987. It was the first laboratory in a medical college where it was aimed to carry out analysis of samples for clinical and forensic purposes. The analytical toxicologist late H C Srivastava worked hard to get a reputation that the honourable courts ordered the tests to be conducted in this laboratory. The laboratory was well equipped with TLC, HPTLC, HPLC, GLC, Voltammetry, Atomic Absorption spectrometry etc. It worked in close collaboration with CFSL, CBI Delhi, FSL Rohini Delhi and JPN NICFS Rohini Delhi,

Crime scene reconstruction
Dogra was engaged in crime scene reconstruction in a variety of cases throughout the length and breadth of the country. He reconstructed the cases pertaining to fall from a height, railway accident, traffic accidents, firearm injuries, bomb blast, asphyxial deaths etc. He examined about 2000 scene of crimes in different states of India.

Dogra's test
He evolved a simple technique to identify old suspected bullet hit marks by lifting the impression using a moldable putty which neither damaged nor made it unfit for further examination of suspected firearm bullet hit marks. More than 2-year-old marks were detected by Professor Dogra at many scenes of occurrences; that is why people started calling it as a Dogra's test.

Forensic animation
During the last decade of his career, he started using animation to explain his finding or observations. He tried it in Batla house encounter, Heren Pandya case,, he also attempted in Ishrat Jehan case but he could not make it in 3D animation as desired.

Forensic Psychiatry and Psychology
Dogra in 1990 while forensic investigations of the death of Jathedar Jagdev Singh Khudian MP of Akali Dal (Mann), first time in collaboration with Psychiatrist and Clinical Psychologist analysed the Psychological status of deceased by getting filled a proforma developed for this purpose from his friends and family. Subsequently, he applied it in many cases, including the psychological profiling of the accused persons of 2006 Noida serial murders.

Mass grave exhumation and Forensic anthropometry and anatomy
Dogra carried out numbers of exhumations in various states of India. He exhumed mass graves in Gujrat following 2002 communal riots and recovered large numbers of skeletal remains, the anthropometric & anatomical examination and DNA profiling established Identity of many of missing individuals. He always encouraged a collaborative approach in such situation. Dogra used Anthropometric and anatomical examination in variety of cases from different part of country including Bhanwari Devi (2011 case) & 2006 Noida serial murders.

Publications and research
Dogra edited Lyon’s Medical Jurisprudence for India, co-authored Practical Aspects of Forensic Medicine and Toxicology and has published more than 200 papers in national and international journals. He has guided more than 50 MD and PhD thesis projects, and supervised or co-supervised research funded by BPR&D, DST, ICAR and WHO. Dogra has been an editorial member or peer reviewer of a number of national and international journals, and has written for the popular press. He is the founder of the Journal of Forensic Medicine and Toxicology and Indian Internet Journal of Forensic Medicine and Toxicology. Dogra founded the Indian Congress of Forensic Medicine and Toxicology, He organised numerous conferences, workshops and seminars, and has delivered guest lectures, inaugural and valedictory talks on a variety of topics.

Committees, consultation and visiting positions
Dogra has been a member of a number of committees constituted by the Government of India, State Governments and AIIMS: the Advisory Committee on Prison Reform (BPR&D); the member (Medical Toxicology)Central Insecticide Board (Ministry of Health and Family Welfare); the member (Medical Toxicology) Registration Committee for Insecticides (Ministry of Agriculture);  RAP and SAC (Research Analysis Panel and Scientific Advisory Committee) of the Centre for DNA Fingerprinting and Diagnostics (CDFD) and the Subcommittee on Medicolegal Services in Delhi. He has consulted with the Central Bureau of Investigation, courts, state Crime Branch CIDs, the National Commission for Human Rights, the National Commission for Women and the National Commission for Protection of Child Rights.
Dogra has been a visiting faculty member at the LNJP National Institute of Criminalistics and Forensic Sciences, the Police Training School, the Judicial Academy (Delhi), the Karkardooma Court (Shahdara), the Judicial Academy (Nanital, Uttrakhand), the Sardar Patel Academy of Police, the Lal Bahadur Shastri National Academy of Administration (LBSNAA) in Mussoorie, U.P., the Academy of Administration and Management (Nanital), CBI Academy (Ghaziabad), the National Academy of Customs Excise and Narcotics (NACEN), HIPA, Haryana Institute of Public Administration and the Institute of Road Traffic Education (IRTE) in Faridabad.

Dogra established and developed the department of forensic medicine at B.P. Koirala Institute of Health Sciences in Dharan, Nepal, a joint venture of the governments of India and Nepal. He has interacted with internationally known forensics experts such as Keith Simpson, Keith Mant, T. K. Marshal, D. J. Ghee, Alec Jeffreys, Michael S Pollanen, Stephen M. Cordner, Henry Lee (forensic scientist) and Derrick J. Pounder.

Arushi, Hemraj murder in Noida
Professor Dogra led the first forensic team along with Arun Kumar Joint director, than Supercop of CBI, team consisted of Rajender Singh director CFSL, other relevant experts from CFSL, CBI, Delhi and from AIIMS including 25 sleuths of CBI. Team started work on 1 June 2008 with examination of scene of crime. Team functioned till the Arun Kumar was called back to his cadre the UP Police from CBI.

Ishrat Jahan Encounter
Amzad Ali Rana of Pakistan, Javed Gulam Sheikh born Pranesh Pillai, Zeeshan Johar and Ishrat Jahan Raza were killed in Police encounter on 15 June 2004. The Gujrat high court constituted SIT (special investigating team) to investigate the encounter. The chairman of SIT constituted a team of experts with Professor T D Dogra as its chairman, experts from CFSL (central forensic laboratory New Delhi) and AIIMS New Delhi were included. Two chairmen of the SIT were changed by the time board of experts submitted their report to R R Verma, then chairman of SIT. It was revealed in 2016 that the report submitted by the team of experts was not taken into considerations by the SIT while concluding their report. It attracted the attention of media and issue was politicised. Some of the files concerning to an affidavit by the then Government of India, in this case were found missing. An inquiry into this matter has been issued by Govt of India.

Bilkis Bano case

After police dismissed the case against her assailants, Bilkis Bano approached the National Human Rights Commission of India and petitioned the Supreme Court seeking a reinvestigation. The Supreme Court granted the motion, directing the Central Bureau of Investigation (CBI) to take over the investigation. CBI appointed a team of experts from the Central Forensic Science Laboratory (CFSL) Delhi and All India Institute of Medical Sciences (AIIMS) under the guidance and leadership of Professor T. D. Dogra of AIIMS to exhume the mass graves to established the identity and cause of death of victims. The team successfully located and exhumed the remains of victims. The trial of the case was transferred out of Gujarat and directing the central government to appoint the public prosecutor. Charges were filed in a Mumbai court against nineteen people as well as six police officials and a government doctor over their role in the initial investigations. In January 2008, eleven men were sentenced to life imprisonment for the rape and murders and a policeman was convicted of falsifying evidence.

Batla House encounter case

The case was referred to T D Dogra of AIIMS New Delhi for expert opinion, subsequently he appeared in court of law as an expert witness, he had explained the event through animation. On 25 Jul 2013, the Saket sessions court in its judgement convicted one of the suspects, Shahzad Ahmad, for murder of police inspector Mohan Chand Sharma and attempted murder of Head Constables Balwant Singh and Rajbir Singh. The court also found Ahmad guilty of obstructing and assaulting public servants, and grievously injuring the police officers to deter them from performing their duty.

Shopian death case
Near to Shopian a town about 40 km away from Srinagar, Kashmir two women were found dead on the banks of Rambiara Nala, the autopsies were conducted by a team of doctors of Kashmir including one lady doctor. The cause of death was given as head injury. The vaginal swabs were preserved which were positive for spermatozoa at FSL Srinagar. There was agitation led by Majlis Musharraf in Kashmir. The police officers were arrested. The matter was taken by Kashmir High court Suo moto. CBI was entrusted with investigations who engaged Professor T D Dogra as chairman of the team of experts, which included experts from CFSL(central forensic laboratory New Delhi) and AIIMS New Delhi. After exhumation and exhaustive examination,  Board of experts concluded that cause of death was drowning and it was a case of deception because vaginal swabs did not belong to the deceased ladies, these were of the source other than the two deceased ladies, it was concluded by DNA Profiling.

Indira Gandhi
Indira Gandhi was brought at 9:30am to the All India Institute of Medical Sciences, where doctors operated on her. She was declared dead at 2:20pm. The post-mortem examination was conducted by a team of doctors headed by Dr. T.D. Dogra. Dr. Dogra stated that as many as 30 bullet wounds were sustained by Indira Gandhi, from two sources, a Sten gun and a pistol. The assailants had fired 31 bullets at her, of which 30 had hit; 23 had passed through her body while 7 were trapped inside her. Dr. Dogra extracted bullets to establish the identity of the weapons and to match each weapon with the bullets recovered by ballistic examination. The bullets were matched with respective weapons at CFSL Delhi. Subsequently, Dr. Dogra appeared in the court of Shri Mahesh Chandra as an expert witness (PW-5), and his testimony lasted several sessions. The cross examination was conducted by Shri P. N. Lekhi, the defence counsel. Salma Sultan gave the first news of assassination of Indira Gandhi on Doordarshan's evening news on 31 October 1984, more than 10 hours after she was shot. She died two weeks and five days before her 67th birthday.

Shanmugam's death during investigations of assassination of Rajiv Gandhi
Shanmugam, one of the prime suspects, allegedly committed suicide in custody of SIT. This drew the attention of media and public. On 30 July 1991, it was raised as a starred question number *t13 in Parliament, by Shri Ram Nayak MP, while replying then Home Minister Shri S B Chavan said in proceedings "..by Dr.T.D. Dogra, Additional Professor and Head of the Department of Forensic Medicines and Dr.D.N. Bhardwaj, Senior Resident Doctor in the Department of Forensic Medicines, All Indian Institute of Medical Sciences, New Delhi. I will read the report for the information of the House so that if the Hon. Members have any doubts... (Interruptions)".

CBI Reconstruct Tulsi Prajapati encounter case
The CBI and a team of forensic science experts reconstructed the alleged fake encounter of Tulsi Prajapati by Gujarat police in 2006 at Chhapri village in the district on Friday. The team headed by Rajendra Singh of the Central Forensic Science Laboratory (CFSL),and T D Dogra of Forensic Medicine Department at All India Institute of Medical Sciences (AIIMS),began the reconstruction early morning. The forensic experts and CBI were assisted by state CID officials. CID was investigating the case before Supreme Court transferred it to the central agency. The experts obtained crucial data such as the distance between the police vehicle and the car in which Prajapati was travelling, location of Prajapati's body after the encounter as per the CID's FIR, how police officers fired at Prajapati and the distance from which they fired.

Personal life
Dogra married Lalita Dogra (nee-Sharma) (03-12-1950 - 24-January 2019) from Palampur, Himachal Pradesh, in 1975. They have two children (Ankit and Aakanksha) and three grandchildren (Shaunak, Vanya and Arnayaa).

See also
 AIIMS New Delhi

References

External links

 Researchgate
 Pubmed 
 Google Scholar
 SGT University
 All India Institute of Medical Sciences, New Delhi
 Publications on DNA Profiling
  *[YouTube Channel on Personality Disorder and Forensic Psychology]

Living people
1947 births
Forensic pathologists
Indian male writers
Medical jurisprudence
Dogra people
Indian forensic scientists
Indian medical writers
Indian pathologists
Medical doctors from Rajasthan
Heads of universities and colleges in India
Academic staff of the All India Institute of Medical Sciences, New Delhi
All India Institute of Medical Sciences, New Delhi alumni
People from Bikaner
Indian medical academics
Indian medical administrators
20th-century Indian medical doctors
Directors of the All India Institute of Medical Sciences, New Delhi